Persiaran Sultan Salahuddin Abdul Aziz Shah or Putrajaya Roundabout is the main thoroughfare or roundabout in Putrajaya, Malaysia. It is world's largest roundabout with a length of 3.5 km (2.2 miles). It was named after Almarhum Sultan Salahuddin Abdul Aziz Shah of Selangor, the eleventh Yang di-Pertuan Agong. Major landmarks in Putrajaya including the Federal Government Complex (Parcel A until D), Perdana Putra, the Putrajaya Independence Square and Putra Mosque are located along this road.

Lists of interchanges

Highways in Putrajaya
Roundabouts and traffic circles

References